Lilian Bader (nee Bailey, 18 February 1918 – 13 March 2015) was one of the first Black women to join the British armed forces.

Early life
Lilian Bader was born at 19 Stanhope Street in the Toxteth Park area of Liverpool to Marcus Bailey, a merchant seaman from Barbados who served in the First World War, and a British-born mother of Irish parentage.

In 1927, Bader and her two brothers were orphaned when their father died. At the age of 9 she was separated from her brothers and placed in a convent, where she remained until she was 20.:176 Bader has explained that it was difficult to find employment 'because of her father's origins: "My casting out from the convent walls was delayed. I was half West Indian, and nobody, not even the priests, dare risk ridicule by employing me."':79

World War II
In 1939, at the onset of the Second World War, Bader enlisted in the Navy, Army and Air Force Institutes (NAAFI) at Catterick Camp, Yorkshire. She was dismissed after seven weeks when it was discovered that her father was not born in the United Kingdom.:177 On 28 March 1941 she enlisted in the Women's Auxiliary Air Force (WAAF), after she heard that the Royal Air Force (RAF) were taking citizens of West Indian descent.:177 She trained in instrument repair, which was a trade newly opened to women. She then became a Leading Aircraft Woman and was eventually promoted to the rank of corporal.:177

In 1943 she married Ramsay Bader, a tank driver who served in the 147th (Essex Yeomanry) Field Regiment, Royal Artillery. She was given compassionate discharge from her position in February 1944, when she became pregnant with her first son.,:218 Ultimately, they had two children together, Geoffrey and Adrian.:177

Postwar life
After the war, Bader and her husband moved to Northamptonshire to raise their family. Bader studied for O-Levels and A-levels in evening classes in the 1960s, then studied at London University where she received a Bachelor of Arts degree. Following this she would have a career as a teacher.:218

Legacy
In 2018, in celebration of the 100th anniversary of women's right to vote, The Voice newspaper listed Bader – alongside Kathleen Wrasama, Olive Morris, Connie Mark, Fanny Eaton, Diane Abbott, Margaret Busby, and Mary Seacole – among eight Black women who have contributed to the development of Britain. In October 2020, Bader was commemorated by the publication of an entry in the Oxford Dictionary of National Biography.

References

Further reading
 Bader, Lilian (1989) Together: Wartime Memoirs of a WAAF 1939–1944. London: Imperial War Museum.

1918 births
2015 deaths
Women's Auxiliary Air Force airwomen
Alumni of the University of London
Navy, Army and Air Force Institutes personnel
People from Toxteth
Military personnel from Liverpool
People from Northampton